Abjuration is the solemn repudiation, abandonment, or renunciation by or upon oath, often the renunciation of citizenship or some other right or privilege.  The term comes from the Latin abjurare, "to forswear".

Abjuration of the realm
Abjuration of the realm was a type of abjuration in ancient English law. The person taking the oath swore to leave the country directly and promptly, never to return to the kingdom unless by permission of the sovereign. This was often taken by fugitives who had taken sanctuary:

English Commonwealth
Near the start of the English Civil War, on 18 August 1643 Parliament passed "An Ordinance for Explanation of a former Ordinance for Sequestration of Delinquents Estates with some Enlargements." The enlargements included an oath which became known as the "Oath of Abjuration":

In 1656–7, it was reissued in what was for Catholics an even more objectionable form. Everyone was to be "adjudged a Papist" who refused this oath, and the consequent penalties began with the confiscation of two-thirds of the recusant's goods, and went on to deprive him of almost every civic right.

The Catholic Encyclopaedia makes the point that the oath and the penalties were so severe that it stopped the efforts of the Gallicanizing party among the English Catholics, who had been ready to offer forms of submission similar to the old oath of Allegiance, which was condemned anew about this time by Pope Innocent X.

Scotland

During The Killing Time of the 1680s an Abjuration Oath could be put to suspects where they were given the option to abjure or renounce their allegiances. The terms of the oath were deliberately designed to offend the consciences of the Presbyterian Covenanters. Those who would not swear "whether they have arms, or not" could be "immediately killed" by field trial "before two witnesses" on a charge of high treason. John Brown was included among those executed in this judicial process by John Graham (Bluidy Clavers) on 1 May 1685. The wives and children of such men could also be put out of their houses if they had spoken to the suspect or refused the oath themselves.

Great Britain and Ireland
In England (and after 1707 Great Britain) the Oath of Abjuration denied the royal title of James II's heirs (i.e. the direct Catholic descendant of the House of Stuart exiled after the Glorious Revolution in 1688).  In England, an Oath of Abjuration was taken by Members of Parliament, clergy, and laymen, pledging to support the current British monarch and repudiated the right of the Stuarts and other claimants to the throne. This oath was imposed under William III, George I and George III. It was superseded by the oath of allegiance.  In Ireland, the oath was imposed of state officeholders, teachers, lawyers, and on the clergy of the established church in from 1703, the following year it was on all Irish voters and from 1709 it could be demanded of any adult male by a magistrate.

Bilino Polje abjuration 

The Bilino Polje abjuration, also known as “Confessio Christianorum bosniensis”, was an act of alleged heresy abjuration by Bosnian clergy in presence of Ban Kulin and Giovanni da Casamari. It was signed by seven priors of the Bosnian Church, on 8 April 1203 at Bilino Polje field, near today town of Zenica, in Bosnia and Herzegovina. The same document was brought to Buda, in 30 April by Giovanni da Casamari, Ban Kulin and two abbots, where it was examined by Emeric, King of Hungary, and the high clergy.

The Netherlands
Another famous abjuration was brought about by the Plakkaat van Verlatinghe of July 26, 1581, the formal declaration of independence of the Low Countries from the Spanish king, Philip II. This oath was the climax of the Eighty Years' War (Dutch Revolt).

See also
 English post-Reformation oaths
 Papists Act 1716

Notes

External links

Latin legal terminology
Oaths